Christophe Karel Henri (Karel) de Nerée tot Babberich (18 March 1880 – 19 October 1909) was a Dutch symbolist artist who worked in the decadent and symbolist style of Aubrey Beardsley and Jan Toorop.

De Nerée was born in Zevenaar (The Netherlands) on Huize Babberich, the son of Frederick Nerée tot Babberich (1851–1882) and Constance van Houten (1858–1930).

De Nerée began drawing and writing in 1898. De Nerée's literary writing and art work was very much inspired by decadent and symbolist authors such as Charles Baudelaire, Paul Verlaine or Gabriele d'Annunzio, and artists as de Feure, Goya, Johan Thorn Prikker, and Jan Toorop. He more and more focused on his art. Only posthumously, in 1916, two poems were publiced in a French periodical.

In 1901, the Nerée worked in Madrid for Foreign Affairs He caught TBC, a disease that would determine his further life. In Madrid De Nerée was visited by his friend Henri van Booven, the future biographer of Louis Couperus, who later gave a thinly veiled report of this visit in his novel Een liefde in Spanje ('A Love in Spain', 1928). De Nerée also inspired Van Booven to write his volume of (prose) poems Witte Nachten ('White Nights', 1901) and the novel Tropenwee ('Tropical Agony', 1904), the latter being a Conrad-like report of his traumatic visit to the Belgian Congo.
In his turn Van Booven gave De Nerée The Early Work (1899) by Aubrey Beardsley. This was obviously great influence  on De Nerée's style of drawing.  Later, around 1904-1905, he developed his own unique style. The themes, usually 'femmes fatales' or clownesque figures, gold nuances and symbolism of these works often recall associations with the best wor He is one of the few 'decadent' Dutch representatives of the European symbolist movement.

During his life he did not exhibit; he was a well-known society figure but few knew his art work which he mostly kept to himself. Only after his death was his work exhibited. He did sell some work during his life though. 
Due to his poor health, drawing and painting became ever more difficult after 1906-1907. The little known works from his later period are characterized by their colors and sometimes almost modernist compositions. He died on 19 October 1909 at 29 years of age, in the southern German town of Todtmoos. He was buried in Clarens, near Montreux.

The nature of his work, the Beardsley-replication and the somewhat'decadent' character, set de Nerée naturally in a somewhat isolated position in art history. During the twentieth century, however his work was exhibited several times and "the Dutch Aubrey Beardsley" has received a welldeserved small but firm place in European art history around 1900.

Works 
A selection of his works:

 Henri van Booven as a young priest (1900)
 Walden, [not used] book cover (1900)
 The beautiful image (1900)
 Introduction to Ecstasy of Couperus (1900–01)
 Ecstasy, finals (1900–01)
 Self Portrait (1900–01)
 Illustration for Le Jardin des Supplices (1899) by Octave Mirbeau (1900)
 Love Game No. 1 (1900–01)
 Black Swans (1901)
 The Bride (1901)
 Two Women (1901)
 Salome (1901)
 Owl (1903)
 Clowning (1904)
 La Musique (1904)
 La rencontre (1904)
 Sortie (1904)
 Rococo (1904–05)
 Rôdeuse (1904–05)
 Portrait Study / selfportrait (1905)
 Study of a Sulamitic (1905)
 Le mauvais regard (1906)

Exhibitions
 The Hague, Kunstkring, 1910
 Amsterdam, Arti, 1910
 The Hague, d'Audretsch (with H. Daalhoff a.o.), 1914
 Haarlem, Du Bois, 1936
 Milan & München, Gallery Levante, 1970
 Laren, Singer Museum, 1974
 Kleve, Städtliches Museum, 1975
 The Hague, Staal Banker, 1982
 Arnhem, Gemeentemuseum, 1986
 Arnhem, Gemeentemuseum, 1998

References

External links

1880 births
1909 deaths
People from Zevenaar
20th-century Dutch painters
Dutch male painters
20th-century Dutch male artists